The Tambov constituency (No.177) is a Russian legislative constituency in Tambov Oblast. Until 2007 the constituency covered the entirety of Tambov and eastern Tambov Oblast, including the cities of Kirsanov, Kotovsk and Rasskazovo. Since 2016 the constituency covered half of Tambov and northwestern part of the region, shedding most of its territory in the east to the new Rasskazovo constituency, while taking a large portion of former Michurinsk constituency.

Members elected

Election results

1993

|-
! colspan=2 style="background-color:#E9E9E9;text-align:left;vertical-align:top;" |Candidate
! style="background-color:#E9E9E9;text-align:left;vertical-align:top;" |Party
! style="background-color:#E9E9E9;text-align:right;" |Votes
! style="background-color:#E9E9E9;text-align:right;" |%
|-
|style="background-color:"|
|align=left|Tamara Pletnyova
|align=left|Communist Party
|
|31.45%
|-
|style="background-color:"|
|align=left|Aleksey Ananyev
|align=left|Independent
| -
|6.70%
|-
| colspan="5" style="background-color:#E9E9E9;"|
|- style="font-weight:bold"
| colspan="3" style="text-align:left;" | Total
| 
| 100%
|-
| colspan="5" style="background-color:#E9E9E9;"|
|- style="font-weight:bold"
| colspan="4" |Source:
|
|}

1995

|-
! colspan=2 style="background-color:#E9E9E9;text-align:left;vertical-align:top;" |Candidate
! style="background-color:#E9E9E9;text-align:left;vertical-align:top;" |Party
! style="background-color:#E9E9E9;text-align:right;" |Votes
! style="background-color:#E9E9E9;text-align:right;" |%
|-
|style="background-color:"|
|align=left|Tamara Pletnyova (incumbent)
|align=left|Communist Party
|
|33.40%
|-
|style="background-color:"|
|align=left|Yury Baturov
|align=left|Independent
|
|10.25%
|-
|style="background-color:"|
|align=left|Eduard Nemtsov
|align=left|Independent
|
|8.66%
|-
|style="background-color:"|
|align=left|Vitaly Zhuravlev
|align=left|Liberal Democratic Party
|
|8.42%
|-
|style="background-color:"|
|align=left|Valery Uvarov
|align=left|Independent
|
|6.22%
|-
|style="background-color:"|
|align=left|Anatoly Petrov
|align=left|Independent
|
|3.61%
|-
|style="background-color:#1A1A1A"|
|align=left|Viktor Aksyuchits
|align=left|Stanislav Govorukhin Bloc
|
|3.60%
|-
|style="background-color:"|
|align=left|Vladimir Markov
|align=left|Agrarian Party
|
|3.43%
|-
|style="background-color:"|
|align=left|Yelena Skorobogatova
|align=left|Independent
|
|3.31%
|-
|style="background-color:"|
|align=left|Vyacheslav Shostakovaky
|align=left|Independent
|
|2.06%
|-
|style="background-color:#FE4801"|
|align=left|Viktor Pashinin
|align=left|Pamfilova–Gurov–Lysenko
|
|1.99%
|-
|style="background-color:"|
|align=left|Aleksey Mishin
|align=left|Independent
|
|1.94%
|-
|style="background-color:"|
|align=left|Lyudmila Yegorova
|align=left|Independent
|
|1.15%
|-
|style="background-color:#000000"|
|colspan=2 |against all
|
|8.49%
|-
| colspan="5" style="background-color:#E9E9E9;"|
|- style="font-weight:bold"
| colspan="3" style="text-align:left;" | Total
| 
| 100%
|-
| colspan="5" style="background-color:#E9E9E9;"|
|- style="font-weight:bold"
| colspan="4" |Source:
|
|}

1999

|-
! colspan=2 style="background-color:#E9E9E9;text-align:left;vertical-align:top;" |Candidate
! style="background-color:#E9E9E9;text-align:left;vertical-align:top;" |Party
! style="background-color:#E9E9E9;text-align:right;" |Votes
! style="background-color:#E9E9E9;text-align:right;" |%
|-
|style="background-color:"|
|align=left|Tamara Pletnyova (incumbent)
|align=left|Communist Party
|
|25.42%
|-
|style="background-color:"|
|align=left|Nina Koval
|align=left|Independent
|
|13.25%
|-
|style="background-color:"|
|align=left|Pavel Zabelin
|align=left|Independent
|
|12.91%
|-
|style="background-color:"|
|align=left|Aleksandr Yegorov
|align=left|Our Home – Russia
|
|10.97%
|-
|style="background-color:"|
|align=left|Yury Baturov
|align=left|Independent
|
|7.21%
|-
|style="background-color:"|
|align=left|Dmitry Yefanov
|align=left|Independent
|
|5.28%
|-
|style="background-color:"|
|align=left|Valery Uvarov
|align=left|Independent
|
|3.71%
|-
|style="background-color:"|
|align=left|Valery Dzhurayev
|align=left|Independent
|
|2.40%
|-
|style="background-color:"|
|align=left|Vladimir Zemtsev
|align=left|Independent
|
|2.05%
|-
|style="background-color:"|
|align=left|Sergey Ivashkov
|align=left|Liberal Democratic Party
|
|1.33%
|-
|style="background-color:#FF4400"|
|align=left|Vasily Popov
|align=left|Andrey Nikolayev and Svyatoslav Fyodorov Bloc
|
|0.66%
|-
|style="background-color:#65297F"|
|align=left|Natalya Sokolova
|align=left|Party of Peace and Unity
|
|0.60%
|-
|style="background-color:"|
|align=left|Vyacheslav Shutilin
|align=left|Independent
|
|0.58%
|-
|style="background-color:#084284"|
|align=left|Vladimir Kuznetsov
|align=left|Spiritual Heritage
|
|0.51%
|-
|style="background-color:#E2CA66"|
|align=left|Galina Kochurova
|align=left|For Civil Dignity
|
|0.51%
|-
|style="background-color:"|
|align=left|Nikolay Pridvorov
|align=left|Independent
|
|0.24%
|-
|style="background-color:#000000"|
|colspan=2 |against all
|
|10.15%
|-
| colspan="5" style="background-color:#E9E9E9;"|
|- style="font-weight:bold"
| colspan="3" style="text-align:left;" | Total
| 
| 100%
|-
| colspan="5" style="background-color:#E9E9E9;"|
|- style="font-weight:bold"
| colspan="4" |Source:
|
|}

2003

|-
! colspan=2 style="background-color:#E9E9E9;text-align:left;vertical-align:top;" |Candidate
! style="background-color:#E9E9E9;text-align:left;vertical-align:top;" |Party
! style="background-color:#E9E9E9;text-align:right;" |Votes
! style="background-color:#E9E9E9;text-align:right;" |%
|-
|style="background-color:"|
|align=left|Ivan Vasilyev
|align=left|Independent
|
|30.79%
|-
|style="background-color:"|
|align=left|Tamara Pletnyova (incumbent)
|align=left|Communist Party
|
|22.65%
|-
|style="background-color:"|
|align=left|Nina Koval
|align=left|Independent
|
|13.78%
|-
|style="background-color:"|
|align=left|Oleg Levchenko
|align=left|Independent
|
|9.88%
|-
|style="background-color:"|
|align=left|Nikolay Vorobyev
|align=left|Independent
|
|2.88%
|-
|style="background:"| 
|align=left|Valery Tomilchik
|align=left|Yabloko
|
|1.08%
|-
|style="background-color:#00A1FF"|
|align=left|Yelizaveta Dolgopolova
|align=left|Party of Russia's Rebirth-Russian Party of Life
|
|0.99%
|-
|style="background-color:#164C8C"|
|align=left|Valery Grishkin
|align=left|United Russian Party Rus'
|
|0.72%
|-
|style="background-color:#000000"|
|colspan=2 |against all
|
|14.10%
|-
| colspan="5" style="background-color:#E9E9E9;"|
|- style="font-weight:bold"
| colspan="3" style="text-align:left;" | Total
| 
| 100%
|-
| colspan="5" style="background-color:#E9E9E9;"|
|- style="font-weight:bold"
| colspan="4" |Source:
|
|}

2016

|-
! colspan=2 style="background-color:#E9E9E9;text-align:left;vertical-align:top;" |Candidate
! style="background-color:#E9E9E9;text-align:left;vertical-align:top;" |Party
! style="background-color:#E9E9E9;text-align:right;" |Votes
! style="background-color:#E9E9E9;text-align:right;" |%
|-
|style="background-color: " |
|align=left|Aleksandr Polyakov
|align=left|United Russia
|
|61.23%
|-
|style="background-color:"|
|align=left|Andrey Zhidkov
|align=left|Communist Party
|
|10.31%
|-
|style="background-color:"|
|align=left|Anatoly Artemov
|align=left|Rodina
|
|7.28%
|-
|style="background-color:"|
|align=left|Irina Popova
|align=left|A Just Russia
|
|6.65%
|-
|style="background-color:"|
|align=left|Konstantin Susakov
|align=left|Liberal Democratic Party
|
|5.55%
|-
|style="background:"| 
|align=left|Vasily Kopylev
|align=left|Communists of Russia
|
|2.72%
|-
|style="background-color:"|
|align=left|Sergey Panfilov
|align=left|The Greens
|
|1.38%
|-
|style="background: "| 
|align=left|Irina Misanova
|align=left|Party of Growth
|
|1.30%
|-
|style="background:"| 
|align=left|Olga Grekova
|align=left|Patriots of Russia
|
|0.97%
|-
| colspan="5" style="background-color:#E9E9E9;"|
|- style="font-weight:bold"
| colspan="3" style="text-align:left;" | Total
| 
| 100%
|-
| colspan="5" style="background-color:#E9E9E9;"|
|- style="font-weight:bold"
| colspan="4" |Source:
|
|}

2021

|-
! colspan=2 style="background-color:#E9E9E9;text-align:left;vertical-align:top;" |Candidate
! style="background-color:#E9E9E9;text-align:left;vertical-align:top;" |Party
! style="background-color:#E9E9E9;text-align:right;" |Votes
! style="background-color:#E9E9E9;text-align:right;" |%
|-
|style="background-color: " |
|align=left|Aleksey Zhuravlyov
|align=left|Rodina
|
|52.26%
|-
|style="background-color:"|
|align=left|Andrey Zhidkov
|align=left|Communist Party
|
|17.08%
|-
|style="background-color:"|
|align=left|Pavel Plotnikov
|align=left|A Just Russia — For Truth
|
|6.97%
|-
|style="background-color:"|
|align=left|Oleg Morozov
|align=left|Liberal Democratic Party
|
|6.03%
|-
|style="background-color: " |
|align=left|Nikita Peresypkin
|align=left|New People
|
|4.06%
|-
|style="background-color: "|
|align=left|Denis Marshavin
|align=left|Party of Pensioners
|
|2.79%
|-
|style="background: "| 
|align=left|Vladimir Zhilkin
|align=left|Yabloko
|
|2.23%
|-
|style="background: "| 
|align=left|Irina Chkhaidze
|align=left|Green Alternative
|
|2.16%
|-
|style="background: "| 
|align=left|Yulia Udalova
|align=left|Civic Platform
|
|1.75%
|-
|style="background: "| 
|align=left|Pavel Khanzhinov
|align=left|Russian Party of Freedom and Justice
|
|1.20%
|-
| colspan="5" style="background-color:#E9E9E9;"|
|- style="font-weight:bold"
| colspan="3" style="text-align:left;" | Total
| 
| 100%
|-
| colspan="5" style="background-color:#E9E9E9;"|
|- style="font-weight:bold"
| colspan="4" |Source:
|
|}

Notes

References

Russian legislative constituencies
Politics of Tambov Oblast